This is a list of airports in Jordan, sorted by location.



List 

ICAO codes link to the Aeronautical Information Publication (AIP) from Jordan's Civil Aviation Regulatory Commission.

See also 

 Transport in Jordan
 List of airports by ICAO code: O#OJ - Jordan
 Wikipedia: WikiProject Aviation/Airline destination lists: Asia#Jordan

References 

Civil Aviation Regulatory Commission (CARC) (formerly Jordan Civil Aviation Authority (JCAA))

External links 
 Jordan Airport global website

Jordan
 
Airports
Airlines
Jordan